Fucosyltransferase 4 (alpha (1,3) fucosyltransferase, myeloid-specific), also known as FUT4, is an enzyme which in humans is encoded by the FUT4 gene.

Function 

The product of this gene transfers fucose to N-acetyllactosamine polysaccharides to generate fucosylated carbohydrate structures. It catalyzes the synthesis of the non-sialylated antigen, Lewis x (CD15).

References